No. 310 Squadron RAF was a Czechoslovak-manned fighter squadron of the Royal Air Force in the Second World War.

History
The squadron was formed on 10 July 1940 at RAF Duxford. It was the first RAF squadron to be raised crewed by foreign nationals, in this case escaped Czechoslovak pilots. Initially it had two Squadron Leaders: the British Douglas Blackwood and the Czechoslovak . Hess and many of his men had served in the Czechoslovak Air Force, escaped from Czechoslovakia after it was occupied by Nazi Germany, and then joined the French Air Force and fought in the Battle of France.

Initially the squadron was equipped with Hawker Hurricane I fighters. The squadron was operational in only a month and as part of 12 Group took part in the Battle of Britain as part of the Duxford Big Wing. The squadron claimed 37½ victories in the battle.

From 1941 the squadron began offensive operations flying sweeps over the English Channel and providing bomber escorts. In 1941 Hess was transferred to be a Czechoslovak liaison officer at Fighter Command, and on 28 February Sqn Ldr  succeeded him in command of 311 Squadron.

In March 1941 the squadron was re-equipped with the Hurricane II. On 26 June it moved to RAF Martlesham Heath in Suffolk. On 19 July 1941 the squadron moved again, to RAF Dyce in Scotland, to rest. It was re-equipped with the Supermarine Spitfire IIa and Vb in October 1941.

On 14 December 1941 the squadron moved to RAF Perranporth in Cornwall for defensive operations. On 7 April 1942 Sqn Ldr František Doležal succeeded Weber as squadron commander. On 7 May the squadron moved to RAF Exeter.

On 15 January 1943 Doležal was succeeded by Sqn Ldr Emil Foit. On 26 June 1943 the squadron moved to RAF Castletown in Caithness, Scotland for another three-month rest period. From July to September it operated the Spitfire VI. On 18 September 1943 the squadron moved to RAF Ibsley in Hampshire.

On 13 January 1944 Sqn Ldr Hugo Hrbáček succeeded Foit as squadron commander. On 20 February the squadron moved to RAF Mendlesham in Suffolk, on 29 March it moved again to RAF Rochford in Essex, and on 3 April it moved again to RAF Appledram in West Sussex. On 21 May Sqn Ldr Václav Raba succeeded Hrbáček as squadron commander.

In 1944 the squadron was re-equipped with the Spitfire IX and became a fighter-bomber unit with 134 Wing, flying ground attack duties during the Normandy landings. From 22 June until 4 July the squadron was based at RAF Tangmere in West Sussex, and from 4 to 11 July it was based at RAF Lympne in Kent.

On 11 July 1944 the squadron moved to RAF Digby in Lincolnshire, and on 28 August it moved again to RAF North Weald in Essex. On 15 September Sqn Ldr Jiří Hartman succeeded Raba as squadron commander. The squadron then spent the rest of the war flying armed reconnaissance missions along the Dutch and Belgian coasts. On 29 December 1944 it moved to RAF Bradwell Bay in Essex, and on 27 February 1945 the squadron moved to RAF Manston in Kent.

The squadron's final score was 52½ claims including four V-1 flying bombs shot down. Three of those flying bombs were shot down on 8 July by the same fighter ace, Flt Lt Otto Smik DFC, in one sortie, within 32 minutes of each other.

On 7 August 1945 the squadron moved to Hildesheim, and on 31 August it moved again to Ruzyně Airport in Prague. It became a squadron of the new Czechoslovak Air Force, and on 15 February 1946 was officially disbanded as an RAF squadron.

Aircraft operated

References

Notes

Bibliography

External links

 – movement and equipment history

 – lists of locations, squadron commanders, flight commanders and aircraft types
 – list of all members

310
Military units and formations disestablished in 1946
Military units and formations established in 1940
310 Squadron
RAF squadrons involved in the Battle of Britain